Leur can refer to:

People 
 Verona van de Leur (born 1985), Dutch gymnast

Place names 
 Leur, Wijchen, a village in the Netherlands, in the province of Gelderland
 Etten-Leur, a town in the Netherlands, in the province of North-Brabant, comprising two former villages, Etten and Leur